Association Sportive Tamarii Punaruu, is a football club from Puna'auia, Tahiti. The club currently competes in the Tahiti Ligue 1, the first tier of the football system in Tahiti, after being promoted following the 2020–21 season. They play their home games at Stade Punaruu.

Honours
Tahiti Ligue 1
Champions: 1969

Tahiti Cup
Winners: 1968, 1969

Tahiti Ligue 2
Winners: 2016–17, 2020–21

Recent seasons

References

External links
Official website

Football clubs in Tahiti
Football clubs in French Polynesia